Ypsilanti may refer to:

People
Alexander Ypsilantis (1792–1828), a national hero in the Greek war for independence in the early 19th century
Alexander Ypsilantis (1725–1805),  Prince of Wallachia and Moldavia, grandfather of the younger Alexander Ypsilanti
Andrea Ypsilanti (b. 1957), German politician
Constantine Ypsilanti (d. 1816), son of the elder Alexander and father of the younger
Demetrius Ypsilanti (1793–1832), the second son of Constantine Ypsilanti

Places
Ypsilanti, Georgia, an unincorporated community
Ypsilanti, Michigan, a city named for Demetrius Ypsilanti, located in Washtenaw County
Ypsilanti Township, Michigan, a charter township near the city of Ypsilanti
Ypsilanti Township, North Dakota, a township in Stutsman County
Ypsilanti, North Dakota, a census-designated place in Ypsilanti Township

See also 
 Ypsilantis, a Greek Phanariote family